Terria is the fifth solo album by Canadian musician Devin Townsend. The album was released in 2001 on Townsend's label, HevyDevy Records.

Background
Feeling he had "attracted a bunch of poo" with his previous album Physicist (2000), Townsend felt he had the chance to make a more personal and honest record. Townsend was inspired one morning while driving across Canada with his band, and looked to write an "introspective" album dedicated to his homeland. He produced and recorded Terria, a "highly illustrated stream-of-consciousness" album, with Gene Hoglan on drums, Craig McFarland on bass and Jamie Meyer on keyboards. The artwork of the album was handled by Travis Smith, who once called it his favorite work along with Katatonia's Last Fair Deal Gone Down. The song "Tiny Tears" derived its title from a Godflesh song with the same name off of their 1989 debut studio album Streetcleaner.

Music
Terria has been described as "melodic and atmospheric", with elements of pop and ambience alongside Townsend's trademark heaviness. Terria features musical themes explored in Townsend's previous albums, such as Ocean Machine: Biomech. However, it is more restrained, "using silence as part of the music". Townsend cited Ween's White Pepper as an inspiration for the album.

"Canada" uses a slowed-down sample of a child speaking, earlier used on "S.Y.L." from Heavy as a Really Heavy Thing.

Release
Terria was released in August 2001 on Townsend's independent label, HevyDevy Records. It is distributed in Canada by HevyDevy, in Japan by Sony, and in Europe and North America by InsideOut. A limited-edition two-disc version was also released, which included the bonus song "Universal", as well as a multimedia element containing footage of a Devin Townsend concert in Japan and audio commentary about the album.

Critical reception

Sputnikmusic gave the album four stars, describing Terria as "not a perfect album, but an immense and, if you let it be, absorbing one."

Track listing

Personnel
 Devin Townsend – guitar, vocals, ambience, samples, keyboards
 Gene Hoglan – drums
 Craig McFarland – fretless bass
 Jamie Meyer – piano, keyboards

Production
 Devin Townsend – production, engineering, mixing
 Shaun Thingvold – engineering, mixing
 Scott Ternan – engineering
 Jamie Meyer – engineering
 Lee Preston – engineering
 Chris Crippen – drum teching
 Mike Bellis – drum teching
 Travis Smith – illustration, design, layout
 Gloria Fraser – photography
 Tracy Turner – management

Chart performance

References

External links
 Terria (HevyDevy Records)
 Terria (InsideOut Music)

2001 albums
Devin Townsend albums
Inside Out Music albums
Albums produced by Devin Townsend
Albums with cover art by Travis Smith (artist)